Gornje Biosko is a village in the municipalities of Istočni Stari Grad (Republika Srpska) and Stari Grad Sarajevo, Bosnia and Herzegovina.

Demographics 
According to the 2013 census, its population was 144 (all Serbs), with 96 of them living in the Republika Srpska part and 48 living in the Federation part.

References

Populated places in Istočni Stari Grad
Villages in Republika Srpska
Populated places in Stari Grad, Sarajevo